Articles relating to Manitoba include:

0-9 

 mb.ca - Second level domain for Manitoba

A 

 Airports in Manitoba
 Airlines of Manitoba

B 

 Breweries, wineries, and distilleries in Manitoba

C 

 Coat of Arms of Manitoba
Climate of Manitoba
Culture of Manitoba
Central Plains Region
Communist Party of Canada (Manitoba)
Communities in Manitoba

D 

 Demographics of Manitoba

E 

 Economy of Manitoba
Executive Council of Manitoba
Elementary schools in Manitoba
Eastman Region

F 

Festivals in Manitoba
First Nations in Manitoba
Franco-Manitoban

G 

 Geography of Manitoba
Green Party of Manitoba

H 

 History of Manitoba
Higher education in Manitoba
Hospitals in Manitoba
High schools in Manitoba

I 

 Indian reserves in Manitoba
Interlake Region

J

K

L 

 Legislative Assembly of Manitoba
Legislative Council of Manitoba
Lieutenant Governor of Manitoba
Lakes of Manitoba
Lighthouses in Manitoba

M 

 Monarchy in Manitoba
 Media in Winnipeg
Manitoba Act
Museums in Manitoba
Manitoba Schools Question
Middle schools in Manitoba
Manitoba New Democratic Party
Manitoba Liberal Party
Manitoba First

N 

 National Historic Sites of Canada in Manitoba
Northern Region

O 

 Outline of Manitoba
Order of Manitoba

P 

 Politics of Manitoba
Premier of Manitoba
Political parties in Manitoba
Parkland Region
Pembina Valley Region
Progressive Conservative Party of Manitoba

Q

R 

 Rivers of Manitoba
 Radio stations in Manitoba
 Red River Rebellion
Regions of Manitoba

S 

 Speaker of the Legislative Assembly of Manitoba

T

U

V 

 Vehicle registration plates of Manitoba

W 

 Westman Region
 Winnipeg Metro Region

X

Y

Z 

 
Indexes of topics by Canadian province